The National Art Gallery of Namibia (NAGN) is a state-owned art gallery situated in Windhoek, the capital city of Namibia. It was founded in 1990. The goal of this institution is to preserve and encourage art in Namibia.

It displays in a permanent exhibition of Namibian, African and European Art. Exhibitions of local artists as e.g. Uli Aschenborn are also held.  Snobia Kaputu is the Chief Executive Officer of the Gallery. Between 2012 and 2017 Hercules Viljoen was the  Director.

See also
List of national galleries

References

External links
 Official website

Namibian culture
Museums in Namibia
Namibia
Art galleries established in 2005
2005 establishments in Namibia